Shannara is a computer game released in 1995 for the MS-DOS and Microsoft Windows. It is based on the Shannara series of books by Terry Brooks.

Gameplay

Plot
Although the game contains characters from the Shannara novels, it is not an adaptation but an original story set after The Sword of Shannara and before The Elfstones of Shannara. Players take on the role of Jak Ohmsford, son of Shea. In Shady Vale, Jak meets Allanon. He tells Jak of the horrible Warlock Lord's return. Jak sets off into the Land of Shannara.

Development

Reception

A reviewer for Next Generation criticized the game, saying it fails both as an entry in the Shannara saga and as an adventure game. He opined that the story lacks the quality and depth of Brooks's novels, instead featuring a linear plot with a generic "villain's revenge" premise, while the gameplay falls short due to its bare bones combat system and its "clunky" overhead view when moving characters long distances.

In Computer Games Strategy Plus, Cindy Yans greatly disliked Shannaras role-playing mechanics, and wrote that "you really want to avoid combat at all costs." However, she praised its puzzles, characters and story, and believed that "most Legend fans" would enjoy the game if they played it as a graphic adventure.

Computer Game Review described it as "a solid story from fantasymeister Brooks", and "an adventure game that will appeal to everyone's tastes and pocketbooks.

References

External links
Official website via Internet Archive

1995 video games
Adventure games
DOS games
Legend Entertainment games
Point-and-click adventure games
Shannara
Single-player video games
Video games based on novels
Video games developed in the United States
Video games scored by George Sanger
Windows games